Wayne Ferreira was the defending champion, but did not participate this year.

Thomas Enqvist won the tournament, beating Brett Steven in the final, 4–6, 6–3, 7–6(7–0).

Seeds

Draw

Finals

Top half

Bottom half

External links
 Main draw

Singles